Rear Admiral Fischer Burges Watson,  (3 September 1884 – 14 August 1960) was a Royal Navy officer who served as Commander-in-Chief of the New Zealand Division.

Naval career
Born the eldest son of Rear Admiral Burges Watson and Marie Thérèse Fischer and educated at Ashdown House and the Royal Naval College, Dartmouth, Watson joined the Royal Navy as a cadet in 1899.

After the War he briefly commanded  before being appointed Assistant to Chief of Staff and Maintenance Captain at Portsmouth in 1920. He became Commanding Officer of the cruiser  in 1924, Chief Staff Officer to the Rear Admiral-in-Charge Gibraltar in 1926 and Naval Assistant to the Second Sea Lord in 1928. He went on to be Commanding Officer of the battleship  in 1930 and Commander-in-Chief of the New Zealand Division in 1932. He retired in 1935 but was recalled in 1939 at the start of the Second World War during which he served on the staff of the Commander-in-Chief Western Approaches before becoming Commodore of Ocean Convoys in October 1940, Senior Officer for Landing Ship Tank Flotilla in the Mediterranean Fleet in April 1943 and Senior Naval Officer at Selsey in May 1944. He last appointment was as Flag Officer-in-Charge at Harwich in September 1944 before retiring again in 1945.

In 1935, Watson was awarded the King George V Silver Jubilee Medal.

Family
In 1909 he married Sybil Mona Caroline Holden; they had three daughters. Following the death of his first wife he married Mabel Harford Underwood in 1931.

References

1884 births
1960 deaths
Commanders of the Order of the British Empire
Companions of the Distinguished Service Order
People educated at Ashdown House
Royal Navy admirals of World War II
Royal Navy personnel of World War I
Military personnel from Somerset